Durango Valley Raiders is a 1938 American Western film directed by Sam Newfield and written by George H. Plympton. The film stars Bob Steele, Louise Stanley, Karl Hackett, Ted Adams, Forrest Taylor and Steve Clark. The film was released on August 22, 1938, by Republic Pictures.

Plot
Durango Valley is controlled by Shadow and his gang. The Sheriff while investigating a killing, arrests ranch worker Keene Cordner, with some help Keene gets out of jail and hides out, but will now become an actual bandit, in the hopes of catching Shadow.

Cast 
Bob Steele as Keene Cordner
Louise Stanley as Betty McKay
Karl Hackett as John McKay
Ted Adams as Lobo
Forrest Taylor as Sheriff Devlin 
Steve Clark as Boone Cordner
Horace Murphy as Matt Tanner
Jack Ingram as Deputy Slade

References

External links
 

1938 films
1930s English-language films
American Western (genre) films
1938 Western (genre) films
Republic Pictures films
Films directed by Sam Newfield
American black-and-white films
Films with screenplays by George H. Plympton
1930s American films